Brian Aidan Close (born 27 January 1982) is a Northern Irish football defender or midfielder who plays for  club Guisborough Town.

Close played in the Football League for Chesterfield and Darlington. He was on the books of Middlesbrough without playing league football for them, and played non-league football for clubs including Billingham Synthonia, Stokesley, Sunderland RCA, West Auckland Town, with whom he reached and lost in the 2014 FA Vase Final, Newton Aycliffe, and a second spell at West Auckland Town, before joining Guisborough Town in September 2017.

He represented Northern Ireland at under-21 and under-23 level.

References

External links

1982 births
Living people
Association footballers from Belfast
Association footballers from Northern Ireland
Northern Ireland under-21 international footballers
Association football defenders
Association football midfielders
Middlesbrough F.C. players
Chesterfield F.C. players
Darlington F.C. players
Billingham Synthonia F.C. players
Stokesley Sports Club F.C. players
Sunderland Ryhope Community Association F.C. players
West Auckland Town F.C. players
Newton Aycliffe F.C. players
Guisborough Town F.C. players
English Football League players
Northern Football League players